Ozvar or Azvar or Azwar may refer to:
 Ozvar, Isfahan
 Ozvar, Kashan, Isfahan Province